The following is a list of the click beetle (family Elateridae) species recorded in Britain. For other beetles, see List of beetle species recorded in Britain.

Agrypnus murinus (Linnaeus, 1758)
Lacon querceus (Herbst, 1784)
Hypnoidus riparius (Fabricius, 1793)
Actenicerus siaelandicus (O. F. Müller, 1764)
Anostirus castaneus (Linnaeus, 1758)
Ctenicera cuprea (Fabricius, 1775)
Ctenicera pectinicornis (Linnaeus, 1758)
Calambus bipustulatus (Linnaeus, 1767)
Aplotarsus angustulus (Kiesenwetter, 1858)
Aplotarsus incanus (Gyllenhal, 1827)
Paraphotistus impressus (Fabricius, 1793)
Paraphotistus nigricornis (Panzer, 1799)
Prosternon tessellatum (Linnaeus, 1758)
Selatosomus aeneus (Linnaeus, 1758)
Selatosomus cruciatus (Linnaeus, 1758)
Selatosomus melancholicus (Fabricius, 1798)
Cidnopus aeruginosus (Olivier, 1790)
Kibunea minuta (Linnaeus, 1758)
Limoniscus violaceus (P. W. J. Müller, 1821)
Denticollis linearis (Linnaeus, 1758)
Athous haemorrhoidalis (Fabricius, 1801)
Athous vittatus (Fabricius, 1793)
Athous subfuscus (O. F. Müller, 1764)
Athous bicolor (Goeze, 1777)
Athous campyloides Newman, 1833
Diacanthous undulatus (De Geer, 1774)
Stenagostus rhombeus (Olivier, 1790)
Hemicrepidius hirtus (Herbst, 1784)
Adrastus pallens (Fabricius, 1793)
Adrastus rachifer (Fourcroy, 1785)
Synaptus filiformis (Fabricius, 1781)
Agriotes acuminatus (Stephens, 1830)
Agriotes lineatus (Linnaeus, 1767)
Agriotes obscurus (Linnaeus, 1758)
Agriotes pallidulus (Illiger, 1807)
Agriotes sordidus (Illiger, 1807)
Agriotes sputator (Linnaeus, 1758)
Dalopius marginatus (Linnaeus, 1758)
Ampedus balteatus (Linnaeus, 1758)
Ampedus cardinalis (Schiødte, 1865)
Ampedus cinnabarinus (Eschscholtz, 1829)
Ampedus elongantulus (Fabricius, 1787)
Ampedus nigerrimus (Boisduval & Lacordaire, 1835)
Ampedus nigrinus (Herbst, 1784)
Ampedus pomonae (Stephens, 1830)
Ampedus pomorum (Herbst, 1784)
Ampedus quercicola ( R. du Buysson, 1887)
Ampedus rufipennis (Stephens, 1830)
Ampedus sanguineus (Linnaeus, 1758)
Ampedus sanguinolentus (Schrank, 1776)
Ampedus tristis (Linnaeus, 1758)
Brachygonus ruficeps (Mulsant & Guillebeau, 1855)
Ischnodes sanguinicollis (Panzer, 1793)
Megapenthes lugens (Redtenbacher, 1842)
Procraerus tibialis (Boisduval & Lacordaire, 1835)
Elater ferrugineus Linnaeus, 1758
Sericus brunneus (Linnaeus, 1758)
Panspaeus guttatus Sharp, 1877
Melanotus castanipes (Paykull, 1800)
Melanotus punctolineatus (Pelerin, 1829)
Melanotus villosus (Geoffroy in Fourcroy, 1785)
Fleutiauxellus maritimus (Curtis, 1840)
Negastrius arenicola (Boheman, 1852)
Negastrius pulchellus (Linnaeus, 1761)
Negastrius sabulicola (Boheman, 1851)
Oedostethus quadripustulatus (Fabricius, 1793)
Zorochros meridionalis (Laporte, 1840)
Zorochros minimus (Boisduval & Lacordaire, 1835)
Cardiophorus asellus Erichson, 1840
Cardiophorus gramineus (Scopoli, 1763)
Cardiophorus ruficollis (Linnaeus, 1758)
Cardiophorus vestigialis Erichson, 1840
Dicronychus equisetioides Lohse, 1976

References

Click beetles